The 2018 Thai League T4 (also known as the Omsin League for sponsorship reasons) was the 18th season of the Thai League 4; it had redirected from the regional league division 2, since its establishment in 2006. The 60 clubs will be divided into six groups (regions). The 15 clubs advance to the Champion league round.

Regional League stage All locations

2018

Red Zone : 2018 Thai League 4 Bangkok Metropolitan Region
Yellow Zone : 2018 Thai League 4 Eastern Region
Pink Zone: 2018 Thai League 4 Western Region
Green Zone: 2018 Thai League 4 Northern Region
  Orange Zone: 2018 Thai League 4 North Eastern Region
Blue Zone: 2018 Thai League 4 Southern Region

List of Qualified Teams

Upper zone 

T4 North (1.5)
 Uttaradit
 Nan
T4 Northeast (2.25)
 Muang Loei United
 Khonkaen United
 Yasothon
T4 East (2.25)
 Bankhai United
 Chanthaburi
 Pluak Daeng Rayong United

Lower zone 

T4 West (2.5)
 Nakhon Pathom United
 IPE Samut Sakhon United
 Hua Hin City
T4 Bangkok (1.75)
 North Bangkok University
 Grakcu Sai Mai United
 BGC
T4 South (1.75)
 Satun United
 Pattani
 Hat Yai

Champions League All stage

Stadium and locations

Upper region

Lower region

Preliminary round 1
3rd place from each zone of 2018 Thai League 4 have signed to qualifying in this round. Preliminary round 1 will be started after finish all matches of all zone by FA Thailand.

Upper region 
The qualifying round will be played in regions featuring clubs from the 2018 Thai League 4 Northern Region, 2018 Thai League 4 North Eastern Region and 2018 Thai League 4 Eastern Region

Lower region 
The qualifying round will be played in regions featuring clubs from the 2018 Thai League 4 Western Region, 2018 Thai League 4 Bangkok Metropolitan Region and 2018 Thai League 4 Southern Region

Play-off round
Runner-up and 3rd place from each zone of 2018 Thai League 4 and winners from Preliminary round 1 have signed to qualifying in this round. Play-off round will be started after finish all matches of Preliminary round 1 by FA Thailand.

Upper region

Lower region

Group Stage round 
9 automatic Thai football teams and Winner teams from Play-off round pass to this round. this round provide 2 part to 2018 Thai League 4 champions league round Upper group and 2018 Thai League 4 champions league round Lower group. Each region has 6 Thai football teams. It plays Round-robin matches. Thai football teams which get champion and runner-up which has the best scores of each region to were promoted to 2019 Thai League 3. Mini-league rule is used to this tournament.

Upper group

Lower group

Final round

Third place play-off round
Runner-up of Upper group and Lower group in Group Stage round pass this round. Winner of Third place play-off round was promoted to 2019 Thai League 3.

|-
|}

Champion round
Champion of Upper group and Lower group in Group Stage round pass this round. Winner of Champion round get champion of 2018 Thai League 4

|-
|}

the best

See also
 2018 Thai League 1
 2018 Thai League 2
 2018 Thai League 3
 2018 Thailand Amateur League
 2018 Thai FA Cup
 2018 Thai League Cup
 2018 Thailand Champions Cup

References

External links
 Official Champions league rule

Thai League T4 seasons
4